Willis Burks II (October 25, 1935 – November 21, 2010), sometimes credited as Willis Burks or Willis Burks, Jr., was an American television, film, stage and voice actor whose acting career spanned more than thirty years.

Burks was born in Birmingham, Alabama, on October 25, 1935. He served in the United States Air Force before pursuing a professional acting career. Burks lived in both Chicago and New York City before settling in Los Angeles, where he resided until his death in 2010.

Burks' awards included the AUDELCO for best actor in the theatrical production of Saint Lucy's Eyes. Additionally, Burks' performance in the August Wilson play, Jitney, won him several awards, including a Drama Desk Award, an Obie Award and a second AUDELCO award.

Burks' movie roles included the 2007 film, King of California, in which he co-starred as Pepper opposite Michael Douglas and Evan Rachel Wood. Other notable roles included Sunday in 1997 and Everything's Jake in 2007, opposite Ernie Hudson and Phyllis Diller. His acting credits also included roles in video games, including The Chronicles of Riddick: Escape from Butcher Bay.

Willis Burks II died on November 21, 2010, at the age of 75. His memorial service was held at the Greater New Macedonia Ministries in Birmingham, Alabama on December 4, 2010. He was survived by four children - Willis Burks, III, Amy Burks-Jones, Europe A. Burks and Jessiah C. Styles.

References

External links

1935 births
2010 deaths
American male film actors
American male stage actors
American male television actors
Drama Desk Award winners
Obie Award recipients
Male actors from Birmingham, Alabama
Male actors from Los Angeles
Male actors from Chicago
Male actors from New York City